Appalachian State Mountaineers basketball may refer to either of the basketball teams that represent Appalachian State University:

Appalachian State Mountaineers men's basketball
Appalachian State Mountaineers women's basketball